Cannibal Corpse is an American death metal band formed in Buffalo, New York in 1988, now based out of Tampa, Florida. The band has released fifteen studio albums, two box sets, four video albums, and two live albums. The band has had little radio or television exposure throughout its existence, although a cult following began to build with the releases of their early albums, including Butchered at Birth (1991) and Tomb of the Mutilated (1992). As of 2015, they achieved worldwide sales of two million units for combined sales of all their albums. In April 2021, Cannibal Corpse received their best "first week" sales of all-time and first Top 10 on the Billboard Top Album Sales Chart as Violence Unimagined entered at No. 6 with 14,000 copies sold.

Bassist Alex Webster came up with the name Cannibal Corpse. They have had several lineup changes since their inception, with Webster and drummer Paul Mazurkiewicz as the only constant members. The members of Cannibal Corpse were originally inspired by thrash metal bands like Metallica, Slayer, Dark Angel, S.O.D., Sadus, Sodom, Kreator, D.R.I. and Sacrifice, and death metal bands such as Possessed, Autopsy, Morbid Angel and Death. The band's album art (most often by Vincent Locke) and lyrics, drawing heavily on horror fiction and horror films, are highly controversial. At different times, several countries, such as Germany and Russia, have banned Cannibal Corpse from performing within their borders, or have banned the sale and display of original Cannibal Corpse album covers.

History
Members from earlier Buffalo-area death metal bands Beyond Death (Alex Webster, Jack Owen), Tirant Sin (Paul Mazurkiewicz, Chris Barnes, Bob Rusay), and Leviathan (Barnes) established the band in December 1988. The band played its first show at Buffalo's River Rock Cafe in March 1989, shortly after recording a five-song self-titled demo tape. Within a year of the first gig, the band was signed to Metal Blade Records, apparently after the label had heard the demo tape that the manager of the record store at which Barnes was working sent in. Their full-length death metal debut album, Eaten Back to Life, was released in August 1990. Inspired by and seeking the new commercial and recording opportunities of the emerging Florida death metal scene, the band relocated to Tampa.

The band has had several lineup changes. In February 1993, founding member and guitarist Bob Rusay was dismissed from the group (after which he became a golf instructor) and was ultimately replaced by Malevolent Creation guitarist Rob Barrett.  In 1995, during recording sessions for a new album, singer Chris Barnes was dismissed because of personal differences with the rest of the band and was replaced by Monstrosity singer George "Corpsegrinder" Fisher. Barnes went on to perform with the band Six Feet Under and, later, Torture Killer.

In February 1997, Barrett, who had replaced Rusay on guitar, left Cannibal Corpse to re-join his previous bands Malevolent Creation and Solstice. Pat O'Brien, who first appeared on Cannibal Corpse's 1998 release Gallery of Suicide, replaced Barrett. Founding member and guitarist Jack Owen left Cannibal Corpse in 2004 to spend more time on his second band, Adrift. He joined Deicide in late 2004. Jeremy Turner of Origin briefly replaced him as guitarist on 2004's Tour of The Wretched Spawn. Barrett re-joined the band for a concert at the Northwest Deathfest in Washington in 2005.  

Writing for the follow-up to Kill (2006) began in November 2007, as indicated in an interview with bassist Alex Webster. Evisceration Plague, Cannibal Corpse's eleventh studio album was released February 3, 2009, to a highly positive response from fans. They also released a live DVD in 2011 entitled Global Evisceration. Cannibal Corpse released its twelfth studio album, Torture, in March 2012. Two early bands of the members reunited for one respective benefit concert each for Tony Lorenzo of the group Sons Of Azrael in January 2012.  

In February 2014, Cannibal Corpse announced that they had begun recording their thirteenth album, A Skeletal Domain, which was released on September 16. "Sadistic Embodiment" was released as a single in July. All the song titles of the forthcoming album were announced on the same day. The same month, Metal Blade announced the publication of the band's authorized biography Bible Of Butchery, written by the British author Joel McIver.

In an August 2016 interview, drummer Paul Mazurkiewicz stated that Cannibal Corpse would likely begin recording a new album in 2017. In September 2017, the band announced their fourteenth studio album Red Before Black, which was released on November 3.

On December 10, 2018, guitarist Pat O'Brien was arrested for assault and battery; his bail was set at $50,000. On the eve of the news of his arrest, Cannibal Corpse was announced as one of the supporting acts for Slayer's final North American tour, which would take place in the spring of 2019 and also be supported by Lamb of God and Amon Amarth. On January 18, 2019, Cannibal Corpse announced that Hate Eternal frontman and former Morbid Angel guitarist Erik Rutan would fill-in for O'Brien on their future tours.

Cannibal Corpse entered the studio in June 2020 to begin recording their fifteenth studio album. On February 1, 2021, the band announced that the album, Violence Unimagined, would be released on April 16. They released a music video for the song "Inhumane Harvest" from the album in February. The video takes its cues from horror movies like Saw. The band also announced that live guitarist Erik Rutan has officially joined the band full-time, in spite of that it is currently uncertain as to whether or not guitarist O'Brien will return to the group following his 2018 legal troubles.

As of January 2023, Cannibal Corpse has begun working on their sixteenth studio album, which was listed by Revolver magazine as one of the "55 Most Anticipated Albums" of the year.

Controversy and publicity

United States

In May 1995, then-US Senator Bob Dole accused Cannibal Corpse—along with hip hop acts including the Geto Boys and 2 Live Crew—of undermining the national character of the United States. A year later, the band came under fire again, this time as part of a campaign by William Bennett, Senator Joe Lieberman, then-Senator Sam Nunn, and National Congress of Black Women chair C. Delores Tucker to get major record labels—including Time Warner, Sony, Thorn-EMI, PolyGram and Bertelsmann—to "dump 20 recording groups [...] responsible for the most offensive lyrics".

Cannibal Corpse also had a cameo appearance in the 1994 Jim Carrey film Ace Ventura: Pet Detective, performing an abridged version of their song "Hammer Smashed Face".

Australia

As of October 23, 1996, the sale of any Cannibal Corpse audio recording then available was banned in Australia and all copies of such had been removed from music shops. At the time, the Australian Recording Industry Association and the Australian Music Retailers Association were implementing a system for identifying potentially offensive records, known as the "labelling code of practice".

All ten of Cannibal Corpse's albums, the live album Live Cannibalism, the boxed set 15 Year Killing Spree, the EP Worm Infested, and the single "Hammer Smashed Face" were re-released in Australia between 2006 and 2007, finally classified by ARIA and allowed for sale in Australia. However, they are all "restricted" and only sold to those over 18 years of age. Some are sold in "censored" and "uncensored" editions, which denotes the change of cover art. Despite this, when displayed in some stores, even the "uncensored" editions are censored manually.

After discussion of banning them from touring, Australian comedy act The Chaser did a lounge music version of their song "Rancid Amputation" on their show The Chaser's War on Everything, claiming that the music, and not the lyrics, was the problem, by performing a lounge music version.

Germany
All Cannibal Corpse albums up to and including Tomb of the Mutilated were banned upon release from being sold or displayed in Germany due to their graphic cover art and disturbing lyrics; the band was also forbidden to play any songs from those albums while touring in Germany. This prohibition was not lifted until June 2006. In a 2004 interview, George Fisher attempted to recall what originally provoked the ban:

Russia
Six of the eight planned shows from the band's 2014 Russian tour were canceled after protests from local Orthodox activists. A month before the tour, religious activist Dimitry Tsorionov said Cannibal Corpse's music was punishable under Russian law because it "incites religious division." He commented unfavorably on the lyrics, saying they promoted "death, violence, as well as various kinds of sexual perversion." The gig in Nizhny Novgorod was stopped halfway through the set, after police conducted a search for drugs at the venue. The concert in Saint Petersburg was canceled at the last minute because of unspecified "technical reasons", OMON arrived shortly after and arrested eighteen concertgoers. Cannibal Corpse members stated that Russian authorities threatened to detain the members if they performed because they did not have the correct work visas.

Responses to critics
Cannibal Corpse's lyrics and album/T-shirt artwork frequently feature transgressive and macabre imagery, including depictions of extreme violence and gore; the band has always defended this as artistic expression that is clearly fictional. In an interview for the documentary Metal: A Headbanger's Journey, George Fisher said that death metal is best understood "as art", and claims that far more violent art can be found at the Vatican, pointing out that such depictions are arguably more transgressive because they actually happened. Some examples of Cannibal Corpse's controversial song titles include "I Cum Blood", "Meat Hook Sodomy", "Entrails Ripped from a Virgin's Cunt", "Necropedophile", "Stripped, Raped, and Strangled", "Addicted to Vaginal Skin", "Stabbed in the Throat", "Dismembered and Molested" and "Fucked with a Knife".

On the same topic, George "Corpsegrinder" Fisher once said in an interview: 

In response to accusations that his band's lyrics desensitize people to violence, Alex Webster argued death metal fans enjoy the music only because they know the violence depicted in its lyrics is not real:

He also believes the violent lyrics can have positive value: "It's good to have anger music as a release." George Fisher explained the content of their songs: "There's nothing ever serious. We're not thinking of anybody in particular that we're trying to kill, or harm or anything."

Band members

Current members

 Alex Webster – bass (1988–present)
 Paul Mazurkiewicz – drums (1988–present)
 Rob Barrett – lead guitar (1993–1997), rhythm guitar (2005–present)
 George "Corpsegrinder" Fisher – vocals (1995–present)
 Erik Rutan – lead guitar (2021–present)

Former members
 Jack Owen – rhythm guitar (1988–2004)
 Chris Barnes – vocals (1988–1995)
 Bob Rusay – lead guitar (1988–1993)
 Pat O'Brien – lead guitar (1997–2021)

Touring musicians
 Jeremy Turner – rhythm guitar (2004–2005)
 Erik Rutan – lead guitar (2019–2021)

Timeline

Recording timeline

Discography

Studio albums
Eaten Back to Life (1990)
Butchered at Birth (1991)
Tomb of the Mutilated (1992)
The Bleeding (1994)
Vile (1996)
Gallery of Suicide (1998)
Bloodthirst (1999)
Gore Obsessed (2002)
The Wretched Spawn (2004)
Kill (2006)
Evisceration Plague (2009)
Torture (2012)
A Skeletal Domain (2014)
Red Before Black (2017)
Violence Unimagined (2021)

See also

Cannabis Corpse

References

External links

 
 

 
1988 establishments in New York (state)
Articles which contain graphical timelines
Death metal musical groups from New York (state)
Metal Blade Records artists
Musical groups established in 1988
Musical groups from Buffalo, New York
Musical groups from Tampa, Florida
Musical quintets
Obscenity controversies in music